Martin "Marty" McDermott is a former Gaelic footballer who played for the St Brigid's GAA club and at senior level for the Roscommon county team. He has also managed several teams and is a bank manager by profession.

Playing career
McDermott played for Roscommon, typically as a midfielder, from the late 1970s and into the early 1980s, getting to the 1980 All-Ireland Senior Football Championship Final in the process. A knee injury forced him out of contention, with McDermott having to settle for an All-Ireland Final and a National League medal secured in 1979 when Roscommon defeated Cork in the final.

Managerial career
But then McDermott took on the manager job, and they said about him in 1991: "In Gaelic games he is a relatively new phenomenon, the 'team manager' - usually young, tracksuited, able to perform a wide range of skills, thick-skinned, a good motivator, a good communicator, a multi-talented father figure - roles which Martin 'Marty' McDermott has become very familiar with over the past few years." McDermott looked up to Mick O'Dwyer and Heffo.

McDermott got the Rossies to the 1982 All-Ireland Under-21 Football Championship Final but Donegal took that one away on them. McDermott took off in 1983. He got his local club St Brigid's and McDermott as manager they got to a Roscommon Senior Football Championship final but lost to Clan na nGael.

Soon he got given the senior Roscommon job. It was a time when the Rossies were emergent and they got reached six provincial finals day out on the spin between 1987 and 1993. McDermott got over the team in 1988. He got them promoted to Division 1 in the second year and were there for the next few years. They were even in two league semi-finals and the high quality of the opposition would stood them in good stead. He won two Connacht Senior Football Championship (SFC) titles as manager in 1990 and 1991. Roscommon is still looking for somone to get two successive Connacht titles, not even Kevin McStay could do it in recent years. The Mayo team that defeated them in 1989 was burnded by a favourite stag earned from the 1989 All-Ireland Senior Football Championship Final but the primrose and blues took them to a replay and actually took them to extra-time at that in 1989 before the loss came. But Roscommon won the day by taking the 1990 Connacht final and got to Croke Park for the first time in nearly a decade only for Cork to account for them. The Leesiders got away from them and the game was up.

The 1990 Connacht final was a 0-16 to 1-11 victory over Galway, a rare time when the Rossies have actually bet the Tribesmen in a provincial final inside Dr Hyde Park. Derek Duggan scored a farmers free into the teeth of a strong wind in the 1991 Connacht SFC final over Mayo over in Castlebar to tie the game up for the Rossies and then they posted a 0-13 to 1-9 score in the replay, again in Dr Hyde Park. Roscommon were within a whisker (a solitaire point) off Meath in the 1991 All-Ireland Senior Football Championship semi-final.

Personal life
McDermott is a native of Oran, and after managing Roscommon to two Connacht SFC titles on the spin in 1990 and 1991, he relocated to South Dublin in 1997, opting for Blackrock-Stillorgan, where he became embedded in Kilmacud Crokes since his son wanted an outlet for his football. McDermott told it in 2022: "From '97 until last year, I was involved on the committees, coaching, management teams". He was also Director of Football "for seven or eight years".

References

Gaelic football managers
Kilmacud Crokes GAA
Roscommon inter-county Gaelic footballers
St Brigid's (Roscommon) Gaelic footballers